Siamspinops garoensis is a species of araneomorphae spider in the family Selenopidae. The species is endemic to Meghalaya, India.

The specific epithet is an adjective and refers to the type locality of the species, Garo Hills.

References 

Selenopidae
Spiders described in 2022